Patapsco is an unincorporated community in Carroll County, Maryland, United States, in the Baltimore metropolitan area.

Major League Baseball player Ben Spencer was born in Patapsco.

References

External links
Patapsco, Maryland Info

Unincorporated communities in Carroll County, Maryland
Unincorporated communities in Maryland